The National Committee of the Republic of Estonia (EVRK) was a deliberative and legislative body, formed by the government of Republic of Estonia (the last government of Estonia before the Soviet occupation) to control the resistance movement in German-occupied Estonia in March 1944. By April 1944 a large number of the committee members were arrested by the German security agencies.

History
The original initiative to form the committee came from the Estonian former pre-plebiscite of 1933 opposition parties and it denied the constitutional authority of Jüri Uluots, the last pre-war Prime Minister of the Republic of Estonia. The Committee aimed to establish a provisional government, during the German withdrawal expected as the Red Army had reached the border of Estonia on February 2, 1944.

On 1 August 1944 the "committee" declared itself even the bearer of the supreme power of State (instead of people).

The Committee succeeded in establishing a communication network with the Estonian diplomats in Finland and Sweden.

In response to this unconstitutional "committee", on 20 April 1944, Jüri Uluots convened the Electoral Committee of the Republic of Estonia (Vabariigi Presidendi Asetäitja Valimiskogu, the institution specified in the Constitution for electing the Acting President of the Republic), which held a clandestine meeting in Tallinn. The participants included:

Jüri Uluots, the last Prime Minister of Estonia before the Soviet occupation, appointed 12 October 1939,
Johan Holberg, the acting Commander-in-Chief of the Armed Forces, appointed 1 December 1943, 
Otto Pukk, the Chairman of the Chamber of Deputies, elected 17 October 1939,
Alfred Maurer, the Second deputy Vice-Chairman of the National Council, elected 21 April 1938,
Mihkel Klaassen, Chairman off the Administrative Department of the State Court of Estonia, appointed 26 September 1938.

The Committee determined that the Soviet-era appointment of Johannes Vares as Prime Minister by Konstantin Päts had been illegal and that Uluots had assumed the President's duties from June 21, 1940, onwards. On 21 April 1944, Jüri Uluots appointed Alfred Maurer and Otto Tief as deputy prime ministers. On 18 September 1944, Uluots, suffering from cancer, named Otto Tief the Acting Prime Minister and appointed a Government which consisted of 11 members. Thus some members of the "national committee" became now members of the constitutional government. On 20 September 1944, Uluots departed for Sweden. Tief assumed office in accordance with the constitution and took the opportunity, with the departure of the Germans, to declare the legitimate Estonian government restored. Most of members of this government left from Tallinn on 21 September and Tief on 22 September. As reported by the Royal Institute of International Affairs at the time, the Estonian national government was proclaimed in Estonia and Estonian military units seized the national government buildings in Toompea Castle and ordered the German forces to leave. The flag of Germany was replaced with the flag of Estonia in the Pikk Hermann tower of Toompea. Tief’s government, however, failed to stay in power as Estonian military units led by Johan Pitka clashed with both Germans and Soviets. On 22 September, the Soviet Leningrad Front took control of Tallinn. Most of the members and officials including Tief were caught, jailed, deported, or executed. Tief managed to survive a decade in Siberia and, after return from deportation, died in 1976. Kaarel Liidak, Minister of Agriculture, died in hiding on 16 January 1945.

After Uluots died on January 9, 1945, in Sweden, August Rei, as the most senior surviving member of the government, assumed the role of acting head of state. Rei was supported by the surviving members of the Tief's government in Sweden. Rei was the last Estonian envoy in Moscow before the Soviet annexation and had managed to escape from Moscow through Riga to Stockholm in June 1940.

On 12 January 1953, the Estonian Government in Exile was appointed in Oslo, Norway.

See also 
Supreme Committee for the Liberation of Lithuania
National Committee for the Liberation of Yugoslavia
National Committee for a Free Germany
Committee for the Liberation of the Peoples of Russia
Japanese People's Emancipation League
Free Albania National Committee

References

Military history of Estonia during World War II
World War II resistance movements
Eastern European World War II resistance movements
Generalbezirk Estland